Tan Sri G. Vadiveloo (Tamil: வடிவேலு கோவிந்தசாமி) is a former president of the Malaysian Senate, serving from 13 April 1992 to 12 June 1995. He is also a former Secretary-General of the Malaysian Indian Congress. Since leaving parliament, Vadiveloo has continued working as CEO of Tafe College and as a trustee of the Maju Institute of Educational Development.

Awards

Honours
  : 
 Commander of the Order of Loyalty to the Crown of Malaysia (P.S.M.) - Tan Sri (1994)
  :
 Knight Commander of the Order of the Crown of Selangor (DPMS) - Dato’ (1989)

References

Living people
Malaysian politicians of Indian descent
Members of the Selangor State Legislative Assembly
Malaysian Indian Congress politicians
Presidents of the Dewan Negara
Commanders of the Order of Loyalty to the Crown of Malaysia
Members of the Dewan Negara
Year of birth missing (living people)
Knights Commander of the Order of the Crown of Selangor
Recipients of Pravasi Bharatiya Samman